The Affiliated High School of Peking University, abbreviated as Běi Dà Fù Zhōng (北大附中) or BDFZ, is a major public high school in Beijing that offers 7th-12th grade education. It is regarded as one of the most prestigious high schools in China. In a 2016 ranking of Chinese high schools that send students to study in American universities, BDFZ ranked high in mainland China in terms of the number of students entering top American universities.

Located in Zhongguancun, the heart of the nation's R&D centre for science and technology, the Affiliated High School of Peking University inherits from Peking University the pursuit for democracy and science since its foundation in 1960. The school's administration and faculty highly encourage students to pursue their intellectual interests in various realms. An environment in favour of student autonomy makes it possible for students at the Affiliated High School of Peking University to engage in various activities ranging from scientific research to environmental advocacy instead of the traditional way of pure textbook-studying.

The Affiliated High School of Peking University has an enrollment of approximately 2,400 students. The school has established partnerships and exchange programs with schools around the world. Distinguished alumni include Wang Yan, the founder of Sina, Mao Xinyu, Major General in the People's Liberation Army and grandson of Chairman Mao Zedong, Zhang Zilin, Miss World 2007 and the first Miss World of Eastern Asian origin, and Ge Li, billionaire Chinese American businessman who co-founded WuXi AppTec.

History

In 1951, the authorities started building a school for workers and farmers in an attempt to expand their horizons. In 1957, the facility was reorganized and designated as Beijing No. 104 High School. Three years later, the school was renamed to High School of Peking University under the direction of Peking University, serving as the second-stage rocket in its parent university's four-stage educational sequence, the first, third and fourth stages being primary school, university and graduate school respectively.

Since the reformation led by Luping, the principal of Peking University in 1960, Peking University has attached high importance to improving the school.
The then-School Counselor of Peking University Yin Qizhuo was appointed the first principal of the high school and 43 teaching staff from the university were seconded to the high as academic reinforcements. With the main support from the university, the High School of Peking University soon came to be regarded as one of the top schools in Beijing. At that time, it was one of the only two schools in Beijing to accept foreign students, one of them being the second son of King Sihanouk of Cambodia.

After the launch of the Cultural Revolution, the high school became the epicentre of the political storm because of its special political position. Motivated young students began to gather around the High School attached to Tsinghua University, forming the very first groups of Red Guards. Reportedly, people were found dead on the campus of the high school during the period of the Cultural Revolution.

Having undergone the chaos of the early phase of the Revolution, the high school was gradually restored to peace. Dedicated teachers went on to provide the best education possible for the students in the circumstances, and graduates from the high school took the crowns in many provinces soon after the resumption of the National Higher Education Entrance Examination (gaokao) in 1978.

The educational system returned to normal after the Cultural Revolution. In the last three decades, the school has seen significant changes in its faculty and campus, and it has also earned a high reputation in the academic circle. Current principal Wang Zheng has made it a priority to rid China of poor running 'franchised' versions of the high school which were built due to a great deal of corruption that plagued the school since 2000.

In 2021 an alumnus made a video showing facilities perceived by other Chinese to be luxurious.

On Mar 17th 2022, Ma Yuguo was announced to be the new principal of the Affiliated High School of Peking University.

Campus

It has seen great changes in the last decade, as most school facilities have been renewed or re-built during that period.

West Teaching Building (High School)

Since its completion in 2003, this six-story building has served as the main teaching facility for senior students (grades 10–12) on campus. The building's teaching spaces include about 40 classrooms, 11 state-of-the-art science labs, and spaces for arts and technology education. Besides, the West Teaching Building houses three performance spaces: an 800- and 200-seat auditorium and "Black Box" theatre. It also hosts a two-story library, a student-run café, and the school's administrative offices.

East Teaching Building (Middle and High School)

The East Teaching Building is mainly for Junior High School. It was completed in 1999 and subsequently renovated in 2007. In 2012 the building lost 2 classrooms on its east side to make way for a major construction project on campus. Since 2019, with the relocation of the junior high school, the east building gradually became the management of the high school.

The complex now consists of two sections. The laboratory section is located on the north side of the building, housing laboratories for physics, chemistry, biology, and technology education. Another section to the south holds 30  classrooms.

North Teaching Building (Yuanpei Academy)

The North Teaching Building was completed at the end of 2016 along with the Xinjian Gymnasium and was put into use in September 2017. There are four floors in the north building. The first floor is used as a platform leading to the Sunken Theater which connects with the Xinjian Gymnasium; the second floor was used as ordinary classroom before September 2019, and then as a normal classroom; the third and fourth floors will be used as normal classrooms.

Now the North Teaching Building is mainly used by the students of Yuanpei College (Hongyi House since 2023 students) and technical classes. Some minorities will also take classes here, such as the Bridging Class (ninth grade) and some Chinese classes in the eleventh grade.

Dormitory, Cafeteria and Main Library

The dormitory was completed in 2003. Each room in the students' residence has the capability of holding up to 6 students. The residence for school staff and visitors stands 11-story high. The cafeteria, completed in 2004, is a five-storied building with an underground parking space. The first three stories are set to serve its enrollment, and the fourth floor is for staff and visitors. The fifth floor is a training facility for the school's dance team, which may also be adapted to special uses when needed. The library is, in fact, a multi-function structure with an area of 3,000m² that saw its completion in 2009. It features a conference room and a multi-function hall. As for its fundamental function, the library holds a collection of 100,000 books  with a wireless network access.

Physical Education facilities

The campus also features a gymnasium in which the badminton courts and the table tennis tables are housed. The gymnasium may be re-deployed for special uses.

South Building

The South Teaching Building was completed in 1960, making it the oldest building on campus. It underwent a major renovation in 2010. Currently, it houses Dalton Academy (the school's international division) on the fifth and sixth floors. It was once used as a classroom for the Dalton Academy (the school's international division). Since the Dalton Academy moved to the fifth and sixth floors of the West Classroom Building, the 2019 students of Beida Resources Middle School have spent three years here. It is now used as an office place for school teachers and other companies’ product development departments.

Extracurricular activities

Clubs And Organizations 
The earliest club of the Affiliated High School of Peking University dates back to 1980
when the Literature Club was initially established. In nearly three decades, the school has developed more than 20 miscellaneous clubs. All of the clubs are hosted, maintained and operated by the students in this school, and every student is granted the privilege to create new clubs at their own will. These clubs, as listed below, are differentiated by their concerned fields.

The student-oriented environment enables the students to join their favorite clubs more freely. It is said that almost everyone in this school holds membership of at least one club, as participating in club activities has been playing a major role in students' extracurricular time. These clubs feature lectures, experience sharing communication, as well as collaborative projects with groups outside the school.

Art Festival
The Art Festival was founded under scholastic authority in 1997. In 2002, the Students' Union succeeded to supervise the festival, converting the once new year party into a three-week festival held in December when distinctively talented students may show their skills to the fullest. It stands now as an integration of various special performances plus a new year celebration (also the closing ceremony of the festival) at the end of the month.

The Campus Singer Competition designates the climax of the entire festival. The first competition in 2004, involved the only a tiny amount of contestants. The figure of the contestants quickly jumped to 250 as it develops, with approximately 800 audiences viewing the final, the most anticipated event of the festival. The Students' Union of the Affiliated High School of Peking University has been collaborating with other schools to organize the competition at a larger scale.

Sports Festival and the Games

Magazine
Overhearing the High School of Peking University (偷听北大附中) is a school magazine hosted by the Students' Union of the High School of Peking University. Its first issue being published on campus on July 12, 2007, this quarterly magazine aims at spreading latest news in and out of the campus, selling approximately 500 copies for each issue, as stated by its editors. The school's Creative Media Workshop, a studio made up of a dozen enthusiastic students, now takes charge of editing the magazine.

International communication

Exchange visits
The Affiliated High School of Peking University has established relationships with over 30 schools in the world. It offers not only various on-campus curriculum that covers Chinese/Mandarin, Chinese Painting, calligraphy, kungfu, but also programs outside the school to enable the foreign students to experience the Chinese culture in body. The following schools are said to have maintained regular visitation to the high school:

 Seifu Gakuen Junior & Senior High School, Japan
 College Claude Debussy, France
 Ressu upper secondary school, Finland
 St. Paul's Convent School, Hong Kong
 Cary Academy, USA
 Scotch College, Melbourne, Australia
 Presbyterian Ladies' College, Melbourne, Australia
 Heinrich Heine Gymnasium, Germany
 Waseda University Honjo Senior High School, Japan
 River Valley High School, Singapore
 Raffles Institution, Singapore 
 Nanyang Girl's High School, Singapore 
 The School of Science and Technology, Singapore 
 Taipei Municipal Chien-Kuo Senior High School
 Chitralada School, Thailand 
 The Perse School, United Kingdom 
 Maru-a-Pula School, The Republic of Botswana 
 College Claude Debussy, France 
 Scotland High School, Australia 
 Hana Academy Seoul, Korea
 Menlo School, USA
 Hotchkiss School, USA

And the Affiliated High School of Peking University visits these schools every one or two years:

 College Claude Debussy, France
 St. Paul's Convent School, Hong Kong
 Scotch College, Melbourne, Australia
 Seifu Gakuen Junior & Senior High School, Japan
 Seiseiko Senior High School, Japan
 River Valley High School, Singapore
 Heinrich Heine Gymnasium, Germany
 Ressu Comprehensive School, Finland

SSAT Confucius Institute

The SSAT Confucius Institute was founded collaboratively by Peking University, the High School of Peking University and Specialist Schools and Academies Trust (SSAT) in July, 2007.
In virtue of the platform provided by SSAT, the High School of Peking University commits itself to the promotion of the Chinese language and the Chinese culture by sending teachers abroad and writing textbooks. The SSAT Confucius Institute was awarded the Confucius Institute of the Year 2008.

Dalton Academy (International Division)
Dalton Academy was founded in 2010 as a “laboratory school” to prepare Chinese high school students who aim to study abroad, primarily in North America. The program takes its name from progressive education activist Helen Parkhurst, an early twentieth-century American associate of John Dewey, who promoted the Dalton Plan as a task-based learning approach to promote student agency in the learning process.

Experiential learning is an important component of the Dalton Academy program. Every Wednesday afternoon, teams of students conduct service learning in their community as part of a 3-year, 400-hour commitment to social practice. The program also organizes many trips abroad, including 13 trips across 4 continents during the 2013–14 academic year.

Study abroad
The school currently hosts two study-abroad programs with Scotch College, Melbourne and American Secondary Schools for International Students and Teachers (ASSIST). Every year, the high school sends two outstanding students to participate in an exchange program where the two participants will spend 8 to 9 weeks as ordinary students at Scotch College, and in the next year, the corresponding students from the Scotch College will pay similar visits to the high school. The ASSIST program, provides opportunities for outstanding students in the high school to attend American independent secondary schools on one-year scholarships.

Former principals

References and notes

1960 establishments in China
Educational institutions established in 1960
High schools in Beijing
Peking University
Peking University
Zhongguancun